Sarcodon roseolus is a species of tooth fungus in the family Bankeraceae. Found in North America, it was described as new to science in 1913 by mycologist Howard James Banker, who collected the type specimens in North Carolina.

References

External links

Fungi described in 1913
Fungi of North America
roseolus